Paul Heywood is a British academic who is head of the School of Politics and International Relations at the University of Nottingham. Heywood is Sir Francis Hill Professor of European Politics, co-editor of Government and Opposition journal and a Fellow of the Royal Society of Arts.

References

Academics of the University of Nottingham
Living people
Year of birth missing (living people)
Historians of the labour movement in Spain